Centralhatchee is a small village  in Heard County, Georgia, United States. The population was 408 at the 2010 census.

History
The town of Centralhatchee was originally a militia district known as "Black Ankle". The community of Glenloch, to the north, was known as "Blue Shin". The geographic configuration of these two communities, according to Native American legend, resembled the ankle and shin portion of the leg and foot. The town became part of Heard County when the county was formed from parts of Carroll, Troup and Coweta counties in 1830.

The town was chartered in 1903 with the name "Centralhatchee". The community takes its name from nearby Centralhatchee Creek.

Geography
Centralhatchee is located in northern Heard County at  (33.368476, -85.104182). Centralhatchee Creek, a south-flowing tributary of the Chattahoochee River, passes just outside of the town limits to the west.

U.S. Route 27, a four-lane highway, passes through the west side of town, leading south  to Franklin, the Heard County seat, and north  to Carrollton.

Demographics

As of the census of 2000, there were 383 people, 136 households, and 105 families residing in the town. The racial makeup of the town was 97.65% White, 2.09% African American, and 0.26% from two or more races. Hispanic or Latino of any race were 1.83% of the population.

There were 136 households, out of which 43.4% had children under the age of 18 living with them, 64.0% were married couples living together, 7.4% had a female householder with no husband present, and 22.1% were non-families. 19.1% of all households were made up of individuals, and 8.8% had someone living alone who was 65 years of age or older.  The average household size was 2.82 and the average family size was 3.20.

In the town, the population was spread out, with 31.9% under the age of 18, 6.3% from 18 to 24, 32.1% from 25 to 44, 22.5% from 45 to 64, and 7.3% who were 65 years of age or older.  The median age was 32 years. For every 100 females, there were 84.1 males.  For every 100 females age 18 and over, there were 90.5 males.

The median income for a household in the town was $37,813, and the median income for a family was $48,500. Males had a median income of $34,000 versus $22,500 for females. The per capita income for the town was $15,491.  About 1.8% of families and 5.4% of the population were below the poverty line, including 3.5% of those under age 18 and 20.0% of those age 65 or over.

Notable person
 Roy Lee Johnson, R&B and soul songwriter, singer and guitarist
 Hugh McGraw, Sacred Harp songleader and composer

See also

 List of towns in Georgia (U.S. state)

References

External links

Towns in Heard County, Georgia
Towns in Georgia (U.S. state)